is a Japanese footballer who plays for Sanfrecce Hiroshima in the J. League Division 1.

In June 2011, Shibasaki was called up to be part of the Japan squad that faced Peru, although he did not play.

Career Stats
Updated to 5 November 2022.

1Includes J2 Playoffs, Japanese Super Cup, J. League Championship and FIFA Club World Cup.

Honours

Club
Sanfrecce Hiroshima
 J.League Cup: 2022

References

External links

Profile at Sanfrecce Hiroshima

1984 births
Living people
Kokushikan University alumni
Association football people from Nagasaki Prefecture
Japanese footballers
J1 League players
J2 League players
Tokyo Verdy players
Kawasaki Frontale players
Tokushima Vortis players
Sanfrecce Hiroshima players
Association football midfielders